Stutes is a surname. Notable people with the surname include:

Louise Stutes (born 1952), American politician 
Michael Stutes (born 1986), American baseball player

See also
Stute